Ichthyophonida is an order of parasitic eukaryotes.

Taxonomy
Members of Ichthyophonida include:
Amoebidiaceae 
Amoebidium 
Amoebidium appalachense 
Amoebidium parasiticum 
Paramoebidiidae
Paramoebidium 
Paramoebidium avitruviense 
Paramoebidium corpulentum 
Paramoebidium curvum 
Paramoebidium ecdyonuridae 
Paramoebidium hamatum 
Paramoebidium stipula 
Ichthyophonida incertae sedis
Anurofeca 
Anurofeca richardsi 
Creolimax 
Creolimax fragrantissima 
Ichthyophonus 
Ichthyophonus hoferi 
Ichthyophonus irregularis 
Ichthyophonus sp. ex Theragra chalcogramma 
Pseudoperkinsus 
Pseudoperkinsus tapetii - a parasite of clams
Psorospermium 
Psorospermium haeckeli 
Sphaeroforma 
Sphaeroforma arctica  - a parasite of amphipods
Sphaeroforma gastrica 
Sphaeroforma napiecek 
Sphaeroforma nootkatensis 
Sphaeroforma sirkka 
Sphaeroforma tapetis 
Caullerya 
Caullerya mesnili

References

Ichthyosporean orders
Parasitic opisthokonts
Opisthokont orders